The 2010 Calabasas Pro Tennis Championships was a professional tennis tournament played on hard courts. It was the tenth edition of the tournament which was part of the 2010 ATP Challenger Tour. It took place in Calabasas, United States between 18 and 24 October 2010.

ATP entrants

Seeds

 Rankings are as of October 11, 2010.

Other entrants
The following players received wildcards into the singles main draw:
  Steve Johnson
  Cecil Mamiit
  Gary Sacks
  Tim Smyczek

The following players received entry from the qualifying draw:
  Nikoloz Basilashvili
  Daniel Kosakowski
  Nicholas Monroe
  Luís Antonio Pérez-Pérez

Champions

Singles

 Marinko Matosevic def.  Ryan Sweeting, 2–6, 6–4, 6–3

Doubles

 Ryan Harrison /  Travis Rettenmaier def.  Rik de Voest /  Bobby Reynolds, 6–3, 6–3

External links
Official Site
ITF Search 
ATP official site

Calabasas Pro Tennis Championships
Calabasas Pro Tennis Championships
Tennis tournaments in the United States
Calabasas, California